Jennifer Holden (born in Chicago, Illinois), is an American actress who appeared in the films Jailhouse Rock, Buchanan Rides Alone, and Gang War. Holden had modeled before being cast in Jailhouse Rock. Later, she was a rock-and-roll singer.

References

External links

American film actresses

Living people
Actresses from Los Angeles County, California
Actresses from Chicago
People from Topanga, California
20th-century American actresses
21st-century American women
Year of birth missing (living people)